Chajian Waterfall is a waterfall located in Chhajjian village, Haripur District of Khyber Pakhtunkhwa the province of Pakistan.

See also 
List of waterfalls of Pakistan

References

Waterfalls of Pakistan
Tourist attractions in Khyber Pakhtunkhwa
Haripur District